The Schuylkill Haven station is a former railroad station in Schuylkill Haven, Pennsylvania. It is located at 12 West Main Street is currently occupied by the Reading Blue Mountain and Northern Railroad as an office building.

The station was originally built by the Reading Railroad, and later served the SEPTA diesel service line that extended from the Norristown section of the Manayunk/Norristown Line to Pottsville, Pennsylvania. The station was taken out of service in 1981, when SEPTA cancelled its diesel service.

Gallery

References

Former SEPTA Regional Rail stations
Former Reading Company stations
Railway stations closed in 1981

Former railway stations in Pennsylvania